Mohammad Shariatmadari (born 24 June 1960) is an Iranian politician and former Minister of Cooperatives, Labour and Social Welfare. He was in position of minister of Industry, from 2017 to 2018. He also served as minister of commerce from 1997 to 2005 in the cabinet of President Mohammad Khatami. He was campaign chairman of Hassan Rouhani for 2017 bid.

Shariatmadari is a reformist and regarded a moderate figure within the camp (in contrast to radical reformers), although he shares some views with the conservatives.

Early life and education
Shariatmadari was born in Tehran on 24 June 1960. He attended the University of Kerman and graduated with a bachelor's degree in electrical engineering.

Career and political activities
Shariatmadari became a member of Council of the islamic revolution  following the 1979 revolution. He is among the founders of Iran’s intelligence ministry and served as deputy intelligence minister. He was one of the supporters of Ayatollah Mohammad Reyshahri in the presidential election in 1997. Reyshahri lost the election and Mohammad Khatami became the president.

He was the minister of commerce from 1997 to 2005 in the cabinet headed by President Khatami. In 2006, he was appointed to then newly founded the Strategic Council for Foreign Relation as a member. He is also a foreign policy advisor to Ali Khamenei, Supreme Leader of Iran.

On 8 October 2013, President Hassan Rouhani appointed Shariatmadari as vice president for executive affairs. He was also appointed as acting Minister of Youth Affairs and Sports on 28 October 2013 after Rouhani's nominee for the post was rejected by the Parliament.

Candidacy for 2013 election
In August 2012, the Society for Defending the Values of the Islamic Revolution announced that Shariatmadari as its candidate for the presidential election to be held in June 2013. He also confirmed it in January 2013. He was among independent and technocrat candidates. On the other hand, he was also regarded as one of the reformist candidates. He announced in April 2013 that he would withdraw his candidacy if Akbar Hashemi Rafsanjani, Ali Akbar Nategh Nouri, Mohammad Khatami or Hassan Khomeini run for the election. In May 2013, Shariatmadari withdrew his candidacy in favor of Rafsanjani.

References

External links

20th-century Iranian engineers
20th-century Iranian politicians
21st-century Iranian politicians
1960 births
Association for Defence of Revolution Values politicians
Deputies of the Ministry of Intelligence (Iran)
Government ministers of Iran
Iranian campaign managers
Living people
People from Tehran
Vice Presidents of Iran for Executive Affairs